Mother is a 2019 Spanish-French drama film directed by Rodrigo Sorogoyen and co-written by Isabel Peña. The film is based on the 2017 short film of the same name directed by Sorogoyen. It stars Marta Nieto, Jules Porier and Àlex Brendemühl.

The film received three nominations at the 34th Goya Awards, including Best Actress for Marta Nieto, her first Goya nomination and Best Adapted Screenplay for Rodrigo Sorogoyen and Isabel Peña.

Plot
Ten years ago, Elena received a call in which Ivan, her six-year-old son, told her that he was lost on a beach in France and that he could not find his father. It was the last thing he knew about him. Now Elena lives on that beach, works as a manager in a restaurant and is starting to leave that dark tunnel where she stayed anchored all this time.

Cast
 Marta Nieto as Elena
 Jules Porier as Jean
 Àlex Brendemühl as Joseba
 Anne Consigny as Léa
 Frédéric Pierrot as Grégory

Release
Mother was the opening film for the Seville European Film Festival (SEFF) in 2019.

The film was released in cinemas in Spain on November 15, 2019. It competed in the Orizzonti Section at the 76th Venice International Film Festival.

Reception

Box office
Mother grossed $0 in the United States and Canada, and a worldwide total of $969,100.

Critical response
On Metacritic, the film holds a rating of 76 out of 100, based on 4 critics, indicating "generally favorable reviews". Ryan Lattanzio from Indiewire gave the film a B writing that the film "turns out to be the least twisted, and most empathetic, entry in the damaged mother movie canon in some time.". Kevin Crust for the Los Angeles Times commented that "despite its melancholy bearing, "Madre" is a hopeful meditation on grief and memory".

Awards and nominations

References

External links
 
 

2019 films
2019 drama films
Spanish drama films
French drama films
2010s Spanish-language films
2010s Spanish films
2010s French films
Caballo Films films